The U.S. state of Connecticut is divided into 169 municipalities, including 19 cities, 149 towns and 1 borough, which are grouped into eight counties. 

Towns traditionally have a town meeting form of government; under the Home Rule Act, however, towns are free to choose their own government structure. Nineteen of the towns in Connecticut are consolidated city-towns, and one (Naugatuck) is a consolidated borough-town.

City incorporation requires a Special Act by the Connecticut General Assembly. All cities in Connecticut are dependent municipalities, meaning they are located within and subordinate to a town. However, except for one, all currently existing cities in Connecticut are consolidated with their parent town. Former inner-cities are listed in a separate table below.

Towns in Connecticut are allowed to adopt a city form of government without the need to re-incorporate as an inner-city. Connecticut state law also makes no distinction between a consolidated town/city and a regular town. Bolded city names indicate the state's largest cities, with the most populated being Bridgeport. Currently, Tolland County and Windham County are the only counties in Connecticut without a single city in them.

List of municipalities in Connecticut

Cities 
Note: There are currently 21 cities in Connecticut and those with a population greater than 100,000 are listed in bold.

Former cities

Gallery

Boroughs

See also 

 Borough (Connecticut)
Administrative divisions of Connecticut
 Connecticut
 List of counties in Connecticut

Notes

References 

 Connecticut State Register and Manual, Sec. VII

External links 

 Census 2000 Gazetteer
 National Association of Towns and Townships
 The Connecticut Conference of Municipalities
 The Connecticut Council of Small Towns

Towns
Connecticut
 
Connecticut